"Do You Really Want to Hurt Me" is a song written and performed by English new wave band Culture Club. Released as a single in September 1982 from the group's platinum-selling debut album, Kissing to Be Clever (1982), it was the band's first UK No. 1 hit. In the United States, the single was released in November 1982 and also became a hit, reaching No. 2 for three weeks.

Release
"Do You Really Want to Hurt Me" was the third single released in Europe by Culture Club and their debut release in the United States and Canada. The song became a UK No. 1 single for three weeks in October 1982. It entered the American Pop chart the week ending 4 December 1982, hit No. 1 in Cash Box magazine, and held at No. 2 for three weeks on the Billboard Hot 100 chart in March and April 1983 (kept from the No. 1 spot by the massive success of Michael Jackson's "Billie Jean"). The single hit No. 1 in Canada. It was also number one in Australia.

This was Culture Club's first major success, after their first two releases at the Virgin Records label, "White Boy" and "I'm Afraid of Me", charted lower in the UK at No. 114 and No. 100 respectively. Producer Steve Levine later said: "We felt very strongly that we had a great track with 'Do You Really Want to Hurt Me' and Virgin agreed."

Within a few days of "Do You Really Want to Hurt Me" being released, David Hamilton on BBC Radio 2 played the song as his record of the week. The song rose rapidly in the UK charts after the group's first appearance on Top of the Pops, which resulted in Boy George's androgynous style of dress and sexual ambiguity making newspaper headlines. The group were only asked to appear on Top of the Pops the night before the show, after Shakin' Stevens pulled out.

In a retrospective review, Allmusic described "Do You Really Want to Hurt Me" as "a simple masterpiece, resonating with an ache that harked back to the classic torch songs of yesteryear."

In 2007, Boy George said that the song was "not just about Culture Club's drummer Jon Moss, my boyfriend at the time. It was about all the guys I dated at that time in my life."

The B-side was a dub version featuring Pappa Weasel in many countries and "You Know I'm Not Crazy" on the US release. On the 12" version of the record, the track "Love Is Cold (You Were Never No Good)" was also included.

Remixes
The song was remixed by DJs Quivver and Kinky Roland in 1998 for a Culture Club compilation called Greatest Moments and the single "I Just Wanna Be Loved". It was also remixed and presented on Culture Club's 2002 box set along with the original demo version.

Re-released as a reggaeton remix in France, it was again a top 20 hit in the summer of 2005.

Music video
The accompanying music video for the song, directed by Julien Temple, featured lead singer Boy George on trial in a courtroom (filmed in Islington Town Hall Council Chamber), with flashbacks to the Gargoyle Club, Soho in 1936 and the Dolphin Square Health Club, Pimlico in 1957. Some scenes were filmed at the Hornsey Road swimming baths in Islington, which later closed in 1991. The jury was in blackface making jazz hands gestures. One band member, Mikey Craig, was not in the video, and was replaced by his brother Greg.

Boy George wears a shirt with the Hebrew writing "תַּרְבּוּת אֲגֻדָּה" ("Tarbut Agudda"), a literal translation of the individual words "culture" and "association" (probably a mistranslation of "club") in a grammatically incorrect order.

Track listings

 7-inch
A. "Do You Really Want to Hurt Me" – 4:22
B. "Do You Really Want to Hurt Me" (Dub version) (feat. Pappa Weasel) – 3:38
(Released at least in UK, Canada, Australia, France, West Germany, Italy, Japan, Portugal, Spain, Sweden)
A. "Do You Really Want to Hurt Me" – 4:23
B. "You Know I'm Not Crazy" – 3:35
(Released in USA, Mexico)

 12-inch
A1. "Do You Really Want to Hurt Me" – 4:22
A2. "Do You Really Want to Hurt Me" (Dub Version) – 3:38
B1. "Love Is Cold" (non-album track) – 4:23
(Released at least in UK, Canada (different cover), USA, Australia, France, West Germany, Italy, Netherlands (different cover), Spain)

 CD single (1992 re-issue)
 "Do You Really Want to Hurt Me" – 4:22
 "Do You Really Want to Hurt Me" (Dub Version) – 3:38
 "Bow Down Mister" (Sitari Bizarri Mix) – 6:24 (Released in Germany in 1992, to promote the compilation album Spin Dazzle)

 CD single (2005 remix)
 "Do You Really Want to Hurt Me" (DJ LBR 2005 remix) – 3:59
 "Do You Really Want to Hurt Me" – 4:25
(Released as a remix version in France, to promote the compilation album Culture Club 2005 – Singles & Remixes, with new video)

Charts

Weekly charts

Year-end charts

Sales and certifications

Blue Lagoon version

The song was covered in 2005 by German band Blue Lagoon on its album Club Lagoon and became a hit in Europe.

Track listings
CD single
 "Do You Really Want to Hurt Me" (radio edit) – 3:29
 "Do You Really Want to Hurt Me" (extended version) – 4:59

Charts

References

1982 songs
1982 singles
1991 singles
2005 singles
Culture Club songs
Songs written by Boy George
Songs written by Roy Hay (musician)
Songs written by Mikey Craig
Songs written by Jon Moss
Song recordings produced by Steve Levine
Blue Lagoon (band) songs
Cashbox number-one singles
European Hot 100 Singles number-one singles
Irish Singles Chart number-one singles
Number-one singles in Australia
Number-one singles in Austria
Number-one singles in Germany
Number-one singles in Sweden
Number-one singles in Switzerland
RPM Top Singles number-one singles
UK Singles Chart number-one singles
LGBT-related songs
Virgin Records singles
Epic Records singles
Sony Music singles
Music videos directed by Julien Temple